Anna Victoria Moorhouse (born 30 March 1995) is an English footballer who plays as a goalkeeper for Orlando Pride of the National Women's Soccer League.

She previously played in England for Everton, Durham, Doncaster Rovers Belles, Arsenal and West Ham United, as well as French Division 1 Féminine team Bordeaux.

Club career
At the age of 11, Moorhouse joined the Chadderton Grasshoppers boys' team where she spent three years before no longer being allowed to play on a boys' team. She switched to Chaddy End girls before spells with Rocs FC and Oldham Athletic. In 2011, Moorhouse was scouted by Manchester United at the age of 16 and spent a year with the team's Regional Talent Club. However, United did not yet have a senior women's team and Moorhouse moved to Everton to begin her senior career a year later. She did not make an appearance for Everton in two seasons behind Rachel Brown and Danielle Hill, with Lizzie Durack and Megan Walsh joining in her second season.

In 2014, Moorhouse joined newly formed WSL 2 club Durham. She spent two seasons with the club, making a total of 15 appearances.

In 2016, Moorhouse made the jump up to the WSL 1 with Doncaster Rovers Belles to compete for playing time with Nicola Hobbs. She made four appearances including on the last day of the 2016 season when already-relegated Doncaster, having lost all 15 of the previous league games, beat Reading 1–0.

Ahead of the 2017 FA WSL Spring Series, Moorhouse moved to Arsenal. She made her debut on 20 May 2017, in the final game of the Spring Series, a 4–2 victory over Birmingham City as Arsenal finished third. During the full 2017–18 season, she made four league appearances behind Sari van Veenendaal but was used as a cup keeper in the early stages as both the FA Cup and League Cup. Arsenal reached the final of both competitions with Moorhouse an unused substitute behind van Veenendaal on both occasions as Arsenal won the League Cup but lost the FA Cup.

In July 2018, Moorhouse left Arsenal in search of more first-team opportunities with newly promoted FA WSL team West Ham United. She split playing time with Rebecca Spencer, each making 10 league starts each although Moorhouse was named the starter in all five FA Cup games as the team reached the final for the first time before losing 3–0 to Manchester City in front of 43,264 at Wembley Stadium. Although Spencer left in the 2019–20 offseason, Moorhouse fell into a backup role behind summer recruit Courtney Brosnan, playing four league games and a further four League Cup games before leaving at the end of the campaign upon the expiration of her contract.

In June 2020, Moorhouse signed as a free agent with French Division 1 Féminine team Bordeaux who had lost starter Erin Nayler that summer. The move reunited her with former Arsenal coach Pedro Martínez Losa. She was the club's first choice keeper, playing in 20 of 22 league games. She conceded 15 goals and kept 10 clean sheets as Bordeaux finished third behind powerhouses Lyon and Paris Saint-Germain, qualifying the team for the UEFA Women's Champions League for the first time in their history. In their Champions League debut, Bordeaux beat Czech team Slovácko and Swedish team Kristianstads DFF 2–1 and 3–1 respectively in the first qualifying round before being knocked out by Wolfsburg on penalties. Moorhouse was substituted off at halftime during the second leg and did not play in the shootout. She became backup behind summer recruit Mylène Chavas during the season before leaving in January 2022.

In January 2022, Moorhouse signed with NWSL team Orlando Pride ahead of the 2022 season. Orlando used allocation money to sign Moorhouse from Bordeaux having lost starter Ashlyn Harris in the offseason. She was second choice behind Erin McLeod but made her debut on March 30, 2022, in a 1–0 defeat to Gotham FC in the 2022 NWSL Challenge Cup. In McLeod's absence, Moorhouse started a further two games, 4–1 and 4–2 defeats to Washington Spirit and North Carolina Courage before being benched in favour of Kaylie Collins to make her professional debut in the final game of the group stage with Orlando already eliminated. Moorhouse also featured in two NWSL regular season during the 2022 campaign. In total she made five appearances in her debut season, all defeats, as she did not keep a clean sheet and conceded 13 goals.

Personal life
Moorhouse attended Liverpool Hope University between 2013 and 2016, earning a bachelor's in sports and exercise science.

Career statistics

Club

Honours
Arsenal
FA Women's League Cup: 2017–18
Women's FA Cup runner-up: 2017–18

West Ham United
Women's FA Cup runner-up: 2018–19

References

External links

 

Living people
1995 births
Footballers from Oldham
English women's footballers
Women's association football goalkeepers
Everton F.C. (women) players
Durham W.F.C. players
Doncaster Rovers Belles L.F.C. players
Arsenal W.F.C. players
West Ham United F.C. Women players
FC Girondins de Bordeaux (women) players
Orlando Pride players
Women's Super League players
Division 1 Féminine players
English expatriate women's footballers
Expatriate women's footballers in France
English expatriate sportspeople in France
English expatriate sportspeople in the United States
Expatriate women's soccer players in the United States
National Women's Soccer League players